Ahamed Siraj Kwikiriza was a Ugandan religious leader. He was the District Qadi of Mbarara District under the Ankole-Kigezi region until 1 September 2017.

Death
Aged 50, Kwikiriza died in a motor accident on 1 September 2017 at Independence Park driving Pajero number UAH 984N rushing from the market to lead Eid-Adhah prayers at Abubakar Mosque in Kakoba division. He was with his son who died on arrival after being rushed to Mbarara referral hospital.
At the time of his death, Siraj had replaced Shiekh Ramadhan Khamis who had been accused of selling muslim property.

He was succeeded by Abdullah Mukwaya.

See also
 List of Qadis of Mbarara District

References 

Sharia judges
Ugandan Muslims
Islam in Uganda
Ugandan Islamic religious leaders